David Thompson Regional Health Authority was the governing body for healthcare regulation in a central area of the Canadian province of Alberta. In April 2009, it was merged with other similar organizations to form Alberta Health Services.

The area region included the communities of:
 Bentley
 Breton
 Castor
 Consort
 Coronation
 Drayton Valley
 Drumheller
 Eckville
 Elnora
 Hanna
 Innisfail
 Lacombe
 Linden
 Olds
 Ponoka
 Red Deer
 Rimbey
 Rocky Mountain House
 Stettler
 Sundre
 Sylvan Lake
 Three Hills
 Trochu
 Wetaskiwin
 Winfield

External links
 David Thompson Regional Health Authority (copy archived April 23, 2013)

Health regions of Alberta